The Église Saint-Georges (Church of St. George) is a Roman Catholic church located on the Place François-Bertras, in the Vieux Lyon quarter, in the 5th arrondissement of Lyon. It is under the direction of the Primatiale parish and was named in honor of Saint George.

History
A church located on this place was built in 550, but was destroyed around 732 during a raid of the Saracens, but was restored in 802 by Leidrade. In the fourteenth century, it remained a parish church, but was used by the Sovereign Military Hospitaller Order of Saint John of Jerusalem, or Order of Malta, and in 1315, the Commandery was located just next and had several windows and two cylindrical towers overlooking the Saône. Lange's family paid for the repairs of the church which were conducted by the commander Humbert de Beauvoir. In 1793, it became a hay barn and became a national property, in 1892, was restored by the architect Pollet.

The current church was rebuilt in 1845 and completed in 1848, after plans by the architect Pierre Bossan who also made plans for the basilica of Fourviere. Abandoned between the late 1970s and 1989, the church was later assigned by Cardinal Albert Decourtray to the Priestly Fraternity of St. Peter under the Motu proprio Ecclesia Dei, which granted the practice of liturgical books of 1962 in Latin.

The community was given by Cardinal Philippe Barbarin to three priests from the Fraternity of St. Peter, who joined the diocese. On 25 August 2007, Cardinal Barbarin signed the incardination of three of the five priests who served the church. Also in 2007, after repairs to the exterior of the church and adjoining spaces, the inauguration took place in the presence of Cardinal Barbarin and Senator-Mayor of Lyon Gérard Collomb.

Architecture
The church was rebuilt in neogothic style. Architect Pierre Bossan, who also made the furniture, later deemed his work on this church as a "youthful mistake". The sculpture on the facade was made by Charles Dufraine and stained glasses are the artwork of Maréchal de Metz. The building is classified as monument historique.

The tower has a height of 67 meters. A polychrome wooden altarpiece of the sixteenth century shows the coronation of the Virgin.

References

External links
  Official site

Roman Catholic churches in Lyon
19th-century Roman Catholic church buildings in France
5th arrondissement of Lyon
Roman Catholic churches completed in 1848
Monuments historiques of Lyon
Gothic Revival church buildings in France
Churches used by the Priestly Fraternity of St. Peter